Lipocosma calla is a moth in the family Crambidae. It was described by William James Kaye in 1901. It is found from southern Mexico south through Central America to northern South America.

References

Glaphyriinae
Moths described in 1901